Leandro Maximiliano Scartascini (born 30 January 1985 in Adrogué, Argentina) is an Argentine football player  He operates either in an attacking midfield position or as a striker.

Career
During 2004 Darlington F.C. boss David Hodgson saw a window of opportunity to transfer Scartascini on the recommendation of a South American contact. Leandro, 19 at the time, joined Darlington on trial for the rest of the season however his fate was sealed when the club were unable to obtain the funds to house the young starlet during his stay in England.

Since 2005 he has played football for Apullum in Romania, Bolívar in Bolivia, Örebro SK in Sweden and UD Alzira in Spain.

External links
Player Profile at soccer.azplayers.com

1985 births
Living people
Argentine footballers
Darlington F.C. players
Club Bolívar players
UD Alzira footballers
Expatriate footballers in Bolivia
Argentine expatriate sportspeople in Bolivia
Association football forwards
Footballers from Buenos Aires